Bernd Gerhard Würsig (born 9 November 1948 in Barsinghausen, Germany) is an educator and researcher who works mainly on aspects of behavior and behavioral ecology of whales and dolphins.  Much of his early work was done in close collaboration with his wife Melany Ann Würsig (born Carballeira), and they have published numerous manuscripts and books together. He is now Professor Emeritus at Texas A&M University, teaching only occasionally but still involved with graduate student and other research. He is especially active with problems and potential solutions concerning Indo-Pacific humpback dolphins, Sousa chinensis, in and surrounding waters of Hong Kong.

Early career and education 
Bernd Würsig is the youngest of three sons of Gerhard and Charlotte Würsig, Silesian refugees who moved to (then) West Germany after the World War II, and to the United States under a refugee family visa in 1956.  They settled in Ohio, and Würsig became interested as a boy in marine mammals after reading books by the Austrian explorers Hans Hass and Lotte Hass, French Jacques Cousteau, and American John C. Lilly.  He went to Ohio State University, and received a Bachelor of Science degree in zoology (minor in Germanic Literature) in 1971.  Würsig went to Stony Brook University (then the State University of New York at Stony Brook), 1971–1978, in an interdisciplinary Ph.D. program with advisors in the Departments of Marine Science, Ecology and Evolution, and Neurobiology and Behavior.  His advisors in the latter two, George Williams in Ecology and Evolution and Charles Walcott in Neurobiology and Behavior, had a strong influence on Würsig's career, as the former imbued him with a sense of the wonders of animal social/sexual strategies, and the latter with a lifelong appreciation for how to think about animal capabilities, relative to our own capabilities of observation with basic tools such as binoculars to sophisticated radio, theodolite, and other remote sensing techniques. Würsig's field advisor Roger Payne, the discoverer of humpback whale song and long-range communication in fin and blue whales, was his mentor during field work on dolphins in coastal Patagonia, Argentina. Würsig also worked with Kenneth S. Norris, University of California at Santa Cruz, 1978–1981, as a National Institutes of Health and National Science Foundation post-doctoral fellow, and then became assistant professor at Moss Landing Marine Laboratories, central California, where he went through the professor ranks in the 1980s, becoming full professor in spring 1989.  That year, he and Melany and their two children Paul and Kim moved to Texas A&M University, where he started the Marine Mammal Research Program (now Marine Mammal Behavioral Ecology Group).

Teaching 
Until Spring 2018, Würsig taught undergraduate and graduate courses in aspects of marine mammalogy, specializing in behavior and behavioral ecology.  He has published widely in the popular literature as part of teaching endeavors, such as for the journals Natural History and Scientific American, and he has been advisor to numerous movies made for television, as well as the IMAX movie “Dolphins” (2000) that was nominated for an Academy Award, Best Documentary Short Subject. He formerly led field courses on marine bird and mammal biology in Argentina, Mexico, Spain, China, New Zealand, Greece, Alaska, and elsewhere, but as Professor Emeritus does so only occasionally.

Research 
Most of Würsig's research, while focused generally on social, sexual, calf rearing, and foraging strategies, has been related to human use of the marine environment, as well as tucuxi and boto dolphins of the Amazon and the now believed to be extinct baiji of the Yangtze River. He may be the only researcher to have worked with both the baiji and the presently highly endangered vaquita, or Gulf of California harbor porpoise of the northern Gulf of California, Mexico. Besides working with river dolphins in Peru and China, Würsig has worked with oceanic whales in Argentina, far east Russia, and the Arctic; and a host of delphinids from the Bahamas to Patagonia Argentina, from north-central California to Hong Kong and South Island New Zealand. A summary of his research life, especially as related to social strategies, is presented by Grady (2003). Much of his work has been collaborative, and he has published with students and colleagues on issues of multi-species interactions among pinnipeds and cetaceans, marine mammals and marine birds, and noise pollution and mitigative effects. His present work is with Indo-Pacific humpback dolphins in Hong Kong, dusky dolphins on the South Island of New Zealand, and western gray whales of far east Russia, all collaboratively with graduate students.

Bernd Würsig and his wife Melany Würsig first described the lives of dusky dolphins, with day/night, seasonal, and overall habitat use patterns. They then went on to describe foraging strategies of dusky dolphins that herd anchovy and communicate with each other within and between groups, with an important communication mode apparently mediated by leaping.

Bernd and Melany Würsig also developed detailed non-invasive photographic recognition of dolphins, a technique now used by hundreds of researchers worldwide, and discovered that common bottlenose dolphins, have an “open” social system of ever-changing affiliations of individuals in groups and subgroups, a now common-accepted concept for many species and populations.

Würsig also accepted two ideas of the great biologist Roger Payne, his field mentor during Ph.D. work, and expanded these throughout much of his own research.  One was the development of theodolite tracking of near-shore cetaceans and boats; the other was identification photos and behavioral descriptions of animals from circling aircraft, with which much behavioral description of bowhead whales, was facilitated by Würsig in the U.S. and Canadian Arctic. This work led to detailed descriptions of surface foraging and social behavior, as well as the fact that bowhead whales at times feed on bottom-dwelling organisms.

Würsig and several colleagues developed and tested a bubble curtain system to reduce underwater industrial noises, and this technique has more recently received much engineering and environmental attention.

Major publications 
Würsig has published about 200 peer review manuscripts, but the most important are probably those that first described results of individual recognition of dolphins by dorsal fin markings, theodolite tracking, and the development of a bubble curtain system to lower the intensity of stationary underwater industrial noises. Würsig co-wrote or co-edited books on the biology of spinner dolphins, marine mammals of the Gulf of Mexico, an encyclopedia of marine mammals, biology of dusky dolphins, and a “coffee table” illustrated National Geographic book on whales and dolphins.  He has written much on behavior and behavioral ecology of cetaceans, with a 1989 summary paper in the journal Science, and popular publications in Scientific American, 1979, 1988. In 1999 Würsig coauthored a paper with international colleagues and former students David Weller and Amanda Bradford on the seasonal patterns of the western gray whales off Sakhalin Island in Russia. He co-published a monograph on social ecology of delphinids, with Shannon Gowans and Leszek Karczmarski. Würsig and the marine mammal program he founded are mentioned in a book on Texas A&M at Galveston. He published an updated monograph on the marine mammals of the Gulf of Mexico. Würsig series-edited seven books by Springer Nature, Heidelberg Germany, on ethology and behavioral ecology of 1) odontocetes, 2) sea otter and polar bear, 3) eared seals and walrus, 4) true (or "earless") seals, 5) sirens, or manatees and the dugong, 6) mysticetes and 7) a discussion of human-caused problems and potential solutions, "Marine Mammals; The Evolving Human Factor". A new one on "Sex in Cetaceans: Morphology, Behavior, and the Evolution of Sexual Strategies" is edited by Würsig and Dara Orbach, also Springer Nature, due to be published Open Source in 2023.

Honors and awards
 1980	Elected Fellow of Research, Explorer's Club
 1986	Dean's Award for Exemplary Teaching, San José State University of California
 1991	Alban Heiser Award for Conservation Activities and Education, the Zoological Society of Houston
 1991-1993	Society for Marine Mammalogy, Elected President
 1998	The Chairman's Award, Committee for Research and Exploration of the National Geographic Society
 2001	Academy Award Nomination, Best Science Movie: IMAX movie "Dolphins"](Würsig was senior science advisor)
 2001-2002	Senior Fulbright Fellow, New Zealand
 2006	Awarded Regents Professorship
 2008	Texas A&M University Former Students’ Award –  Excellence in Graduate Mentoring
 2010	Minnie Piper Professor of 2010, for Teaching and Education
 2012	George Mitchell Chair in Sustainable Fisheries
 2013	Designated University Distinguished Professor
 2015	Texas A&M University Former Student's Award - Excellence in Teaching
 2016	Elected University Distinguished Professor Emeritus
 2018	American Cetacean Society's John E. Heyning Life Time Achievement Award in Marine Mammal Science
 2018	Festschrift in Honor of Bernd Würsig, Aquatic Mammals Vol. 44(6):587-768.
 2019	Nominated Honorary Life Member of the Society for Marine Mammalogy

References

External links 
 Texas A&M University, Marine Mammal Behavioral Ecology Group
 Bernd Würsig's personal web page

1948 births
Living people
People from Hanover Region
American educators
German emigrants to the United States